Elizabeth Rogers (born Betty Jayne Rogers, May 18, 1934 – November 6, 2004) was an American actress.

Life and career

Born in Austin, Texas, she played minor characters in thirty-seven episodes of a dozen different prime-time network series, including Little House on the Prairie, Bewitched, Gunsmoke (1966-"The Well"-S12E9), The Waltons,  Marcus Welby, M.D., Dragnet 1966, Mannix, Dragnet 1967, Bonanza, The Time Tunnel, Land of the Giants, Dr. Kildare, Gunsmoke and Slattery's People.

In the original Star Trek television series, she portrayed Lt. Palmer, a substitute communications officer, in two episodes: "The Doomsday Machine" (1967) and "The Way to Eden" (1969). (Another actress, Barbara Baldavin, also served as a substitute communications officer, Lt. Lisa, in the final episode of the series, "Turnabout Intruder". This episode was not aired by NBC until June 1969, as a late season 3 episode, after the network had confirmed that the series was not returning for a season 4, the 1969–70 season.)

For Doomsday Machine, Rogers was brought in at the last minute after Nichelle Nichols (the series regular as communications officer Lt. Uhura) informed the producers that she was flying to New York for a concert performance. As Nichols had no standard contract she was legally free to do so, but Rogers' appearance was intended to convince her to keep herself available for Star Trek. Rogers said in a later interview, "I got the part when Uhura [Nichols] had a singing engagement. I was used as an instant 'threat' replacement."

During the 1970s, she also appeared in a string of Irwin Allen produced films including The Poseidon Adventure (1972) and The Towering Inferno (1974). She was a personal friend of Allen and his wife, Sheila Matthews Allen, and was married to actor Erik Nelson (also a regular in Irwin Allen films) in the backyard of Allen's home. Her other film appearances included Bittersweet Love (1976), The Van (1977), Grand Theft Auto (1977), and An Officer and a Gentleman (1982) as David Keith's mother.

Death
She died from multiple strokes and lung cancer on November 6, 2004, in Tarzana, California at the age of 70.

Filmography

References

External links
 
 

1934 births
2004 deaths
American film actresses
American television actresses
Deaths from lung cancer in California
Actresses from Austin, Texas
20th-century American actresses
21st-century American women